Reinkarsee is a lake of Tyrol, Austria, northeast of the Kröndlhorn. It is drained by the Windauer Ache, a tributary of the Brixentaler Ache.

Lakes of Tyrol (state)
Kitzbühel District
Kitzbühel Alps
Tarns of the Alps